Dicranolepis is a genus of flowering plants belonging to the family Thymelaeaceae.

Its native range is Tropical Africa.

Species:

Dicranolepis angolensis 
Dicranolepis baertsiana 
Dicranolepis brixhei 
Dicranolepis buchholzii 
Dicranolepis cerasifera 
Dicranolepis disticha 
Dicranolepis glandulosa 
Dicranolepis grandiflora 
Dicranolepis incisa 
Dicranolepis laciniata 
Dicranolepis persei 
Dicranolepis polygaloides 
Dicranolepis pubescens 
Dicranolepis pulcherrima 
Dicranolepis pusilla 
Dicranolepis pyramidalis 
Dicranolepis soyauxii 
Dicranolepis thomensis 
Dicranolepis usambarica 
Dicranolepis vestita

References

Thymelaeaceae
Malvales genera